§ 219a was a German penal law in the Strafgesetzbuch that prohibited medical professionals from mentioning that they provided abortions. It is out of force since 19 July 2022.

The bill that repealed paragraph 219a passed the Bundestag on 24 June with the votes of the Scholz traffic light coalition and votes from The Left party. The Bundesrat passed it without using its right to objection on 8 July. The repeal was signed into law by the German federal president on 18 July 2022.

History 
The law dated back to § 219 and § 220 of the Reichsstrafgesetzbuch as at 1 June 1933, in early Nazi Germany. Both paragraphs resulted from a right-wing populist debate dating back to the Weimar Republic and the previous German Empire.

Final reform in 2019 
In 2019, under the Fourth Merkel cabinet, Germany for the last time reformed § 219a. This allowed medical practices to mention on their websites that they conduct abortions, but no more.

The new § 219a led to some more sentences. The first medical doctor sentenced under the reformed paragraph was fined 2,000 euros in 2019 for stating, "Medical abortion without anaesthetic in a protected atmosphere is also part of our services." The violation consisted in specifying, beyond the mere fact they offer abortions, that the procedure was "without anaesthetic" and "medical" as opposed to surgical abortion.

In another case in 2019, a German gynaecologist practice was fined 2,500 euros for stating on their website that they conducted "abortion, surgically or medically with Mifegyne".

Links 

 § 219a Strafgesetzbuch at dejure.org – The law with commentary

References 

Abortion in Germany
Scholz cabinet
Fourth Merkel cabinet